Beta Scuti, Latinized from β Scuti, is a binary star system in the southern constellation Scutum.  Based upon an annual parallax shift of 3.56 mas as seen from Earth, it is located approximately 920 light years from the Sun. The primary component has an apparent visual magnitude of +4.22 and is radiating about 1,270 times the luminosity of the Sun from its outer atmosphere at an effective temperature of 4,622 K. This yellow-hued star is a G-type bright giant with a stellar classification of G4 IIa.

This is a spectroscopic binary with an orbital period of 2.3 years and eccentricity around 0.35. The secondary is about 3.3  magnitudes dimmer than the primary and estimated as type B9 based on the flux of far-ultraviolet radiation.

The secondary was directly detected with a magnitude difference of 3.6 at a separation of about 17 milli-arcseconds using observations 
from the Navy Precision Optical Interferometer. This detection was significant as observations with the Hubble Space Telescope which indicated a companion star was present were not definitive. With an orbit and a parallax the sum of the masses of the two stars can be determined via a dynamical parallax. This eventually can yield a precise mass for the evolved giant primary star. 

Beta Scuti was a latter designation of 6 Aquilae.

References

G-type bright giants
Spectroscopic binaries
Scutum (constellation)
Scuti, Beta
BD-04 4582
173764
092175
7063
TIC objects